This is a list of bishops and archbishops of the Prince-Bishopric of Bamberg and Roman Catholic Archdiocese of Bamberg in Germany.


Bishops, 1007–1245
 Eberhard I 1007-1040
 Suidger von Morsleben 1040-1046 (Later Pope Clement II)
 Hartwig von Bogen 1047-1053
 Adalbert of Carinthia 1053-1057
 Günther 1057-1065
 Herman I 1065-1075
 Rupprecht 1075-1102
 Otto I of Mistelbach 1102-1139
 Egilbert 1139-1146
Eberhard II von Otelingen 1146-1170
 Hermann II von Aurach 1170-1177
 Otto II of Andechs 1177-1196
 Thimo von Lyskirch 1196-1201
 Konrad von Ergersheim 1202-1203
 Ekbert of Andechs 1203-1231
 Siegfried von Öttingen 1231-1238
 Poppo of Andechs 1238-1242
 Heinrich I von Bilversheim 1242-1245, continued as Prince-Bishop

Prince-Bishops, 1245–1802

 Heinrich I von Bilversheim 1245-1257, bishop since 1242
 Wladislaw of Silesia 1257
 Berthold von Leiningen 1257-1285
 Mangold von Neuenburg 1285 (Bishop of Würzburg 1287-1303)
 Arnold von Solms 1286-1296
 Leopold I von Grundlach 1296-1303
 Wulfing von Stubenberg 1304-1318
 Ulrich von Schlusselberg 1319
 Konrad von Giech 1319-1322
 Johannes von Schlackenwerth 1322-1324
 Heinrich II von Sternberg 1324-1328
 Werntho Schenk von Reicheneck 1328-1335
 Leopold II von Egloffstein 1335-1343
 Friedrich I von Hohenlohe 1344-1352
 Leopold III of Bebenburg 1353-1363
 Friedrich II von Truhendingen 1363-1366
 Louis of Meissen 1366-1374
 Lamprecht von Brunn 1374-1399
 Albrecht von Wertheim 1399-1421
 Friedrich III von Aufsess 1421-1431
 Anton von Rotenhan 1431-1459
 Georg I von Schaumberg 1459-1475
 Philipp von Henneberg 1475-1487
 Heinrich Groß von Trockau 1487-1501
 Veit Truchseß von Pommersfelden 1501-1503
 Georg Marschalk von Ebnet 1503-1505
 Georg Schenk von Limpurg 1505-1522
 Weigand von Redwitz 1522-1556
 Georg Fuchs von Rügheim 1556-1561
 Veit von Würzburg 1561-1577
 Johann Georg Zobel von Giebelstadt 1577-1580
 Martin von Eyb 1580-1583
 Ernst von Mengersdorf 1583-1591
 Neytard von Thüngen 1591-1598
 Johann Philipp von Gebsattel 1599-1609
 Johann Gottfried von Aschhausen 1609-1622 (Bishop of Würzburg 1617-1622)
 Johann Georg Fuchs von Dornheim 1623-1633
 Franz von Hatzfeld 1633-1642 (Bishop of Würzburg 1631-1642)
 Melchior Otto von Voit von Salzburg 1642-1653
 Philipp Valentin Albrecht Voit von Rieneck 1653-1672
 Peter Philipp von Dernbach 1672-1683
 Marquard Sebastian von Schenk von Stauffenberg 1683-1693
 Lothar Franz von Schönborn 1693-1729
 Friedrich Karl von Schönborn 1729-1746 (also Bishop of Würzburg)
 Johann Philipp Anton von Franckenstein 1746-1753
 Franz Konrad von Stadion und Thannhausen 1753-1757
 Adam Friedrich von Seinsheim 1757-1779 (also Bishop of Würzburg)
 Franz Ludwig von Erthal 1779-1795 (also Bishop of Würzburg)
 Christoph Franz von Buseck 1795-1802

Archbishops, 1818–present